BOH, also known as 3,4-methylenedioxy-β-methoxyphenethylamine, is a drug of the phenethylamine class. It is the β-methoxy analog of methylenedioxyphenethylamine (MDPEA) and is also more distantly related to methylone. On account of its similarity to norepinephrine, the effects of BOH may be of a purely adrenergic nature.

BOH was first synthesized by Alexander Shulgin. In his book PiHKAL, the dosage range is listed as 80–120 mg, and the duration listed as 6–8 hours. Shulgin reports that BOH causes slight warmth, mydriasis, anorexia, mild nausea, and cold feet, with no psychedelic, entactogen, or euphoriant effects. He gives it a ++ on the Shulgin Rating Scale.

Legality

United Kingdom
This substance is a Class A drug in the Drugs controlled by the UK Misuse of Drugs Act.

See also 
 BOB
 BOD
 BOHD
 MDMA
 MDPEA
 Methylone

References 

Benzodioxoles
Ethers
Phenylethanolamine ethers
Norepinephrine releasing agents